Adam Kemball Dein (1889 – 9 May 1969), known as Dick Dein, was an Australian politician. He was a United Australia Party member of the Australian House of Representatives from 1931 to 1934, representing the electorate of Lang, and of the Australian Senate for New South Wales from 1934 to 1940.

Dein was born at Lucknow, New South Wales and was educated at Shadforth Public School. He left school at 14 and worked as a gold miner and on a dairy farm before training as a teacher in 1907. He taught at Hadsonville and Hanover, Neville, Dubbo and Narromine before moving to Dulwich Hill in Sydney in 1921. In 1926, he was promoted to deputy headmaster of Dulwich Hill Public School. He was heavily involved in local sporting circles, playing both first-grade cricket and tennis for Marrickville. He was president of the Dulwich Hill branch of the Nationalist Party from 1926 to 1931.

In 1929, he contested the Division of Lang in the Australian House of Representatives as a Nationalist, but was unsuccessful. He ran again in 1931 under the banner of the United Australia Party and won. A redistribution ahead of the 1934 election turned Lang into a very safe Labor seat. Rather than face certain defeat, Dein contested the Senate instead, and was successful. He was defeated in 1940.

He opened a timber business in 1939 and operated it thereafter. He served as a Marrickville Council councillor from 1944 to 1950 and on the Sydney County Council from 1949 to 1950. He subsequently moved to Manly, and was a Manly Council councillor from 1962 to 1968 and Mayor of Manly in 1966. He died in 1969 and was cremated at the Northern Suburbs Crematorium.

References

 

United Australia Party members of the Parliament of Australia
Members of the Australian House of Representatives for Lang
Members of the Australian House of Representatives
Members of the Australian Senate for New South Wales
Members of the Australian Senate
1889 births
1969 deaths
20th-century Australian politicians
Mayors of Manly, New South Wales
Councillors of Sydney County Council